The 1944 United States Senate election in Pennsylvania was held on November 7, 1944. Incumbent Republican U.S. Senator James J. Davis sought re-election, but was defeated by Democratic nominee Francis J. Myers.

Ignoring Arlen Specter's brief tenure as a Democrat during the 111th United States Congress (the result of a party switch), this election marked the only time between 1856 and 2023 with the election of John Fetterman that Pennsylvania has sent two members of the Democratic Party to the United States Senate: during the 79th United States Congress, Myers served alongside Democratic Senator Joseph F. Guffey, who would lose re-election in 1946.

General election

Candidates
James J. Davis, incumbent U.S. Senator (Republican)
Frank Knotek (Socialist Labor)
Francis J. Myers, U.S. Representative from Philadelphia (Democratic)
Charles Palmer (Prohibition)
J. Henry Stump, mayor of Reading (Socialist)

Results

References

1944
Pennsylvania
United States Senate